Council High School may refer to:

 Council High School (Idaho)
 Council High School (Virginia)